The Kamini Yacht Club is a yacht club based on the island of Hydra in Greece.  The club is commonly known by the acronym KYC.

The yacht club's principal clubhouse is situated in Kamini port, with secondary clubhouses in London, England and Cornwall, England for overseas members. Membership is by constitution restricted to those with a connection to Hydra Island and who are actively interested in yachting.

Burgee

The KYC burgee, a design by British artist Thomas Hoar, features an azure octopus on a white background with yellow border.

References

Yacht clubs in Greece
Hydra (island)
1956 establishments in Greece